Émile Gaudreault, ( born March 6, 1964) is a Quebec director, author, screenwriter and producer. Since 1994, he has been directing, writing and producing feature films as well as episodes for television series. Several of his films have won awards in Quebec and Canada and have been adapted for the United States and France.

Early life 
Émile Gaudreault was born in Sainte-Foy to a mother who was a teacher and a father who taught theology. During his childhood, he moved to the Lac-Saint-Jean region, first to Lac-à-la-Croix, then to Alma and finally to Jonquière, where he studied art and media technology at Cégep.

Career 
Émile Gaudreault made his debut as an author and also on stage, in the comedy shows of the Groupe Sanguin.

For the big screen, he co-wrote Louis 19, King of the Airwaves, a comedy that was the highest-grossing Canadian film in 1994 and won the Golden Screen Award, in addition to being the subject of an American remake under the title of Edtv (directed by Ron Howard).

In 2001, he directed his first feature film, Wedding Night, another successful comedy that won the Golden Reel (Genie Award) for the highest-grossing Canadian film.

He then co-wrote and directed Mambo Italiano, released in theaters in 30 countries. The film deals with coming out in the Italian community.

In 2007, he directed Surviving My Mother, which won the prize for the most popular Canadian film at the Montreal World Film Festival.

In 2009, the fourth film he directed, Father and Guns, received critical and popular success and as such this film was awarded the Golden Reel Award for the highest-grossing Canadian film.

Then followed A Sense of Humour in 2011, Le Vrai du Faux in 2014, and Père Fils Thérapie, a remake of De père en flic shot in France with a French cast.

In 2017, he returned with a sequel to Father and Guns 2  which won the Golden Screen award for the highest-grossing Canadian film.

In 2018, he was awarded the lifetime achievement Bobine d'or by the Association of Quebec Cinema Owners.

His latest feature film Compulsive Liar is released in the summer of 2019 and is named at the end of the same year "Canadian Film of the Year" by Playback Magazine.

In 2017, Émile Gaudreault created his company “Les films du lac” which would be a partner for the production of the films Menteur and Lignes de fuite, feature films which he co-wrote as well. He also co-produced the latter.

By passing the $30 million mark at the box office with the release of Compulsive Liar, a first for Quebec, Gaudreault shows that his cinematic style appeals to Quebec audiences.

In July 2022 will be released a French remake of Compulsive Liar produced by Gaumont and directed by Olivier Baroux (Entre amis, Les Tuche).

Filmography

Film

Accolades

References

External links
 

1964 births
Film directors from Quebec
Canadian screenwriters in French
Canadian gay writers
LGBT film directors
Writers from Saguenay, Quebec
Living people
Canadian LGBT screenwriters
Gay screenwriters
Screenwriters from Quebec
20th-century Canadian screenwriters
20th-century Canadian male writers
20th-century Canadian LGBT people
21st-century Canadian screenwriters
21st-century Canadian male writers
21st-century Canadian LGBT people